Cleanskin is a 2012 British spy thriller film written and directed by Hadi Hajaig and starring Sean Bean, Abhin Galeya, Charlotte Rampling, James Fox, Tuppence Middleton, Shivani Ghai and Michelle Ryan. The story is set in London. The film's title, "cleanskin", is a term for an undercover operative unknown to his or her targets, or, as more commonly used in the United Kingdom following the London bombings, an extremist with no previous convictions, so therefore unknown to national security's services.

Plot
Harry, a British arms dealer, is seen in bed with a prostitute named Rena. Harry's bodyguard Ewan is an MI6 Secret Intelligence Service Agent. Harry and Ewan travel to a bank, transporting a briefcase of Semtex. The men are followed by two terrorists, Ash and Paul. Ash incapacitates Ewan, kills Harry and takes the briefcase. However, Ewan manages to shoot Ash in the arm before losing consciousness.

Ash sews the stolen Semtex into a jacket with an explosive belt. He gives the jacket to Adel, who detonates it at a popular London restaurant. Being the only person who knows about the stolen explosives, Ewan is tasked by his two SIS superiors Charlotte and Scott to find and eliminate the terrorists who created the bomb. His mission is off-the-books and isolated from the agency. He is given an assistant, rookie agent Mark. Ewan finds and interrogates Rena. She tells Ewan and Mark that a man she frequented, Paul, paid her for information about Harry and to unload his gun. Ewan, Mark, and Rena attempt to capture Paul at his residence. Paul kills Rena, but is killed by Ewan.

At a cafè, Ash sees Kate, his former lover in university, and they exchange numbers. A series of flashbacks reveal Ash's recruitment into the terrorist organization.  Six years ago, Ash and Kate were dating while attending law school. At the school, Nabil, a Muslim extremist, befriends Ash and asks him to join the pro-Muslim student group he heads. Ash and his friend Yussif join the group and are exposed to Nabil's anti-Western teachings. Kate's infidelity with Nick alienates Ash, prompting him to beat him up and break up with Kate. Ash devotes himself to Nabil's cause, and helps capture and murder a former soldier, Greg Conlan, with Yussif and Conlan's family dying in the process.

In the present, Ewan and Mark are sent to an abandoned building they are told is the home of a terrorist. Ewan confronts the man they find there and interrogates him. The man begs for mercy, but Ewan burns him to death. Searching the building, Ewan takes the man's jacket.  Ewan and Mark arrive at a housing estate, where they are noticed by Ash and another man wearing a bulky jacket. The unknown man takes off running, and Ash gets away on his motorcycle. Mark chases after the unknown man and shoots him dead. Mark and Ewan are told by Charlotte that the SIS has found out about their covert mission and is hunting them. Later, when Ewan is sleeping in a hotel, Mark breaks in and tries to kill him, only to fail and die in a fight. Isolated, Ewan resolves to end the terror cell before he is killed. Using Mark's earpiece, he discovers that Mark's allies are facilitating the next bombing.

Ash spends time with Kate and leaves her for a final suicide mission. Nabil tasks Ash with killing the head of a pro-Iraqi War think tank at his daughter's wedding in London. Ash makes a video explaining his reasons justifying his planned suicide attack. He travels to the wedding reception but is confronted by Ewan. Both are wounded in a fight, but Ash gets away. Disguising himself as a waiter, Ash makes his way to the reception's head table, but he is shot dead by Ewan. After disabling the detonator, Ewan leaves the hotel. At the exit, Ewan notices men in suits delivering luggage on a trolley into the hotel lobby and then driving away from the hotel. Moments later, a bomb hidden in this luggage detonates in the hotel lobby, killing Nabil's targets.

In the epilogue, Ewan finds a safe deposit box key in the jacket of the man he killed earlier. He discovers a folder and video camera. He watches the tape, which identifies the man as Hussein Malik, an undercover SIS agent. Ewan, after seeing the file and recording, deduces that Charlotte engineered Malik's death, Ewan's assassination attempt, and framed Scott for being corrupt to cover her tracks. Ewan confronts Charlotte with the lighter at her countryside mansion and kills her, framing her death as a suicide.

Cast
Sean Bean as Ewan
Abhin Galeya as Ash
Charlotte Rampling as Charlotte McQueen
Peter Polycarpou as Nabil
Tom Burke as Mark
Tuppence Middleton as Kate
Michelle Ryan as Emma
Sam Douglas as Harry
James Fox as Scott Catesby
Tariq Jordan as Paul
Shivani Ghai as Rena
Chris Ryman as Yussif

Reception
, Cleanskin held a critical approval rating of 53% on Rotten Tomatoes.

References

External links
 
 

2012 films
2012 crime thriller films
2010s spy thriller films
British crime thriller films
British spy thriller films
2010s English-language films
Films about murderers
Films about terrorism
Films set in London
Films shot in London
2010s British films